John MacGregor, John Macgregor or John McGregor may refer to:

Sportsmen
 John McGregor (footballer, born 1851), Scottish international football player
 John McGregor (footballer, born 1900) (1900–1993), English football player
 John McGregor (footballer, born 1963), Scottish football player
 John MacGregor (rugby union) (fl. 1909), Scottish rugby union player

Politicians
 John McGregor (Upper Canada politician) (c. 1751–1828), businessman and political figure in Upper Canada
 John MacGregor (Glasgow MP) (1797–1857), MP representing Glasgow
 Jack McGregor (born 1934), American senator
 John MacGregor, Baron MacGregor of Pulham Market (born 1937), British politician, MP, and government minister
 John Malcolm Macgregor, British diplomat, Ambassador to Austria, 2003–2007
 John MacGregor (Australian politician) (1828–1884), member of the Victorian Legislative Assembly in the 1860s & 70s
 John MacGregor (New Zealand politician) (1850–1936), New Zealand lawyer, politician and writer

Others
 John Macgregor (1802–1858), Scottish shipbuilder
 John MacGregor (sportsman) (1825–1892), Scottish explorer, travel writer and philanthropist
 John MacGregor (VC) (1889–1952), Canadian recipient of the Victoria Cross, 1918
 John F. MacGregor (born 1943), Canadian statistician and chemical engineer
 John L. MacGregor, Canadian Scouts Movement official
 Jon McGregor (born 1976), British contemporary author